This is the results breakdown of the general election held in Turkey on 7 June 2015.

Overall result

Nationwide results

Adana

Adıyaman

Afyonkarahisar

Ağrı

Aksaray

Amasya

Ankara

1st electoral district

2nd electoral district

Antalya

Ardahan

Overseas results

Albania

Algeria

See also
Results breakdown of the Turkish general election, 2011

References

June 2015 Turkish general election
Election results in Turkey